Sean Stemaly is an American country singer and songwriter. He was previously signed to Big Loud Records, and released the album Product of a Small Town.

Biography
Stemaly was born in Western Kentucky, and raised in Newburgh, IN. Prior to pursuing a career in music, Stemaly worked for his father and grandfather who operate a land development company and a farm. In his teens, Stemaly taught himself to sing while driving a tractor. Stemaly cites Ronnie Dunn, Tyler Childers, and Luke Combs as musical influences.

In August 2019, Stemaly signed with Big Loud Records and released the track "Back on a Backroad", co-written by Hardy.

Since joining Big Loud, Stemaly has released four more songs: “Z71”, "Last Night All Day", "Come Back to Bed", and "As Far As I Know". Stemaly has also opened on tour dates for Morgan Wallen, Riley Green, Hardy, Lanco, and Chris Lane.

Discography

Studio albums

Music videos

References

American male singer-songwriters
American country singer-songwriters
Big Loud artists
Country musicians from Indiana
Living people
Year of birth missing (living people)
Singer-songwriters from Indiana